Richard Terfry (born March 4, 1972), better known by his stage name Buck 65, is a Canadian alternative hip hop artist. Underpinned by an extensive background in abstract hip hop, his more recent music has extensively incorporated blues, country, rock, folk and avant-garde influences.

Terfry is also a radio host, hosting the weekday Drive show on CBC Music since September 2, 2008. In addition, he once hosted a weekday program on CBC Radio 3's web radio station.

History

Early career and influences
Terfry was born in 1972 and raised in Mount Uniacke, Nova Scotia, a rural community 40 km north of Halifax. Terfry was initially interested in pursuing a career in professional baseball, and at age 16, was scouted by the New York Yankees; however, his dream was ended following a shoulder injury. He was first exposed to rap music in the mid-1980s while listening to CBC Stereo's late-night show Brave New Waves, and then by listening to Halifax campus community radio station CKDU. CKDU then broadcast at only 33 watts, and he had to climb a tree in his yard to hear the station's hip hop show on his radio. Fascinated by hip hop, the young Terfry taught himself how to rap, DJ, and, later, to produce records. In 1990, Terfry self-produced his first song, "The Rhyme Has To Be Good", which later received airplay on the Halifax college radio station. His musical influences include MC Shan, David Lynch, Gitche Manitou  and Kool Keith.

Using the moniker DJ Critical, he later hosted a hip-hop show on CKDU called The Bassment (later renamed The Treatment Program when he assumed the stage name Jesus Murphy), which aired for several years. This period overlapped with many of his non-major-label releases.

Stage names
Buck 65 has used a number of other stage names including Johnny Rockwell, Stinkin' Rich, Haslam, and Uncle Climax. These pseudonyms typically represent different characters in his raps (as in Uncle Climax, Johnny Rockwell and Stinkin' Rich) or different aspects of Buck's creativity (as noted above, DJ Critical was his DJ name on CKDU).

He explains the origin of his main performance name as follows: "I was born with the name Richard Terfry. Where I come from, it's common when a boy is named after his father, for the father to refer to the son as 'Buck'. I don't know where that comes from or when it started. It might be a 'out-in-the-country' thing. Growing up I knew lots of sons who were referred to as 'Buck'. Sometimes even if they weren't juniors. So the joke became, I was one of 65 (a number picked randomly) 'Bucks' in my town."

However, when appearing on Andy Kershaw's radio show in the UK on August 8, 2004, he gave a totally different explanation: some of his earliest public performances were with an older blues musician who used to joke that Terfry's regularity at showing up made him as reliable as a 1965 Buick. The nickname Buick 65 stuck until it was misprinted on a publicity poster as 'Buck 65' which he then adopted as his stage name.

Buck 65 has recorded an EP under the name of Dirk Thornton alongside Irishman DJ Flip, it was scheduled for release early 2007 but the date was not set. The first release under Dirk Thornton was a 7-inch vinyl single with the tracks "Yesterday's News" and "Catwalk."

Early releases
In 1993, he released his first cassette of rap tunes while performing under the alias Stinkin' Rich on the Halifax label No Records. The five song cassette was titled Chin Music, which was a reference to his interest in baseball. The release brought Stinkin' Rich to the attention of members of Halifax alternative rock band Sloan. Sloan signed him to their independent record label Murderecords and released a 7-inch single and a full length cassette called Game Tight, again featuring a reference to baseball. As Stinkin' Rich, he also appeared on numerous songs by Halifax hip hop band Hip Club Groove.

After a brief break, Terfry returned reconstituted as Buck 65, releasing Weirdo Magnet (on Metaforensics) and Language Arts in 1996, followed by Vertex in 1997 (both on Four Ways to Rock/Metaforensics), and the 12" single The Wildlife (on Hand'Solo Records) in 1998. He recorded "Sebutonedef" (released in 1996 by Funtrip Records) as a collaboration with fellow Halifax artist Sixtoo. Other releases by the duo, known as Sebutones, are Psoriasis and 50/50 Where It Counts. While still far from mainstream success, he received several odd jobs in Canada's entertainment industry, including making soundtrack music and providing narration for a TV commercial for NBA apparel, and song lyrics for the popular children's program Sesame Street.

Man Overboard, originally released on Anticon in 2001, was a significant turning point in his career. The record, and the entire Anticon collective (of which Sixtoo was also a part), were considered hallmarks of a new avant-garde movement in underground hip hop. It was at this time that Buck met Cincinnati DJ Mr. Dibbs, who inducted him into the 1200 Hobos, a loosely knit hip-hop collective named for their proficiency in manipulating the Technics 1200 turntable. Also in 2001, Buck performed at the Snow Jam festival in 2001, and later that year, he released his next studio album, Synesthesia, on Endemik Records; the album was re-released the next year with a significantly different track listing on Warner Music Canada.

Major label releases

In 2002, Buck 65 signed a record deal with Warner Music Canada, which subsequently released much of his back catalogue, including Weirdo Magnet, Language Arts, Vertex, Man Overboard, and Synesthesia. During this time, he released two albums for the label, the first being Square in 2002, which was nominated for a Juno Award in 2003 for Alternative Album of the Year and Album Design of the Year. In 2003, Buck 65 released Talkin' Honky Blues, which saw a major stylistic shift in his music, incorporating elements of country music, folk, bluegrass, and electronica, amongst other musical styles; it later won the 2004 Juno Award for Alternative Album of the Year.

After a deal was signed with V2 Records in the United States, This Right Here Is Buck 65 was released in early 2005. The album is a compilation of previously released songs, re-recordings, and B-sides that was marketed as an introduction to his work for U.S. audiences. However, after V2 chose not to release his next effort, Secret House Against the World, the deal was amicably dissolved. Secret House Against the World was released in 2005 by Warner Music Canada, and saw Buck further experimenting with varying musical styles. Buck 65 gained additional recognition in 2006 when he appeared at the national Juno Awards with Pamela Anderson.

Dirty Work, Situation and Dirtbike
In late 2006, Buck 65 released a 5-song digital EP called Dirty Work. It was released over a month-long campaign, adding one song per week for free download via his website.

Buck 65 released the album Situation on October 30, 2007 on Strange Famous Records in the United States and Warner Music Group worldwide. The album is a concept album based around the year 1957, and is a return to a more "pure" hip hop sound than the previous blues, country and avant-garde influences in Secret House Against the World. It was produced by fellow Halifax DJ Skratch Bastid, aimed at making a "classic hip-hop record that pulses with joy and clarity of purpose". The album appeared on the Billboard Heatseekers Albums chart for one week at number 31.

He was a host of CBC Radio 3's web radio in 2006 and 2007, and accepted daily hosting duties on CBC Radio 2's Radio 2 Drive beginning fall 2008.

He played with Symphony Nova Scotia in the Rebecca Cohn Auditorium on April 18, 2008.

In late 2008, Buck 65 released three one-track albums for free download. The three Dirtbike albums featured guest production and verses by Cadence Weapon, Emily Wells, D-Styles, Skratch Bastid, Serafina Steer, Jorun, Moka Only, Aupheus, Mia Clarke of Electrelane, Doseone among others. Dirtbike 1/3 signified a return to Buck 65's pre-Talkin' Honky Blues hip hop roots that was expected in Situation; in Buck 65's own words "it's a lot like the original versions of Vertex and Man Overboard."

In 2009, Buck 65 contributed "Blood Pt. 2" to the AIDS benefit album, Dark Was the Night, produced by the Red Hot Organization. It is a remix of Sufjan Stevens' take on the song "You Are the Blood", originally by Castanets.

Buck 65 formed Bike for Three! with Belgian producer Greetings from Tuskan (born Joëlle Phuong Minh Lê). Their debut album, More Heart Than Brains, was released on Anticon on May 26, 2009. The album features "sharp lyrical details and storytelling" by Buck 65, combined with Phuong Minh Lê's production creating an "exquisite, shimmering landscape that rarely plays by the rules."

20 Odd Years, Neverlove, and Laundromat Boogie
On February 1, 2011, Buck 65 released 20 Odd Years, named in honor of his twentieth anniversary in the music industry. The album continued the tradition of combining several different musical styles, and featured many different guest collaborators. The album was preceded by a series of four EPs, released digitally and on 7" vinyl: 20 Odd Years, Vol. 1: Avant (released June 8, 2010); 20 Odd Years, Vol. 2: Distance (July 12, 2010); 20 Odd Years, Vol. 3: Albuquerque (August 10, 2010); and 20 Odd Years, Vol. 4: Cenotaph (September 14, 2010). The latter EP was withdrawn from availability, presumably due to copyright issues involving Buck's sampling of the Bronski Beat single, "Smalltown Boy." The album primarily featured songs from these EPs, including a cover of Leonard Cohen's "Who By Fire", as well as two previously unreleased songs. Buck 65 later released an additional EP in the series titled 20 Odd Years Vol. 4: Ostranenie (November 21, 2011).

Buck 65 released Neverlove on September 30, 2014. The album was inspired by his divorce from his ex-wife. One day before its release, he also released the more lighthearted, and previously unannounced, album Laundromat Boogie through producer Jorun Bombay's Bandcamp page. Prior to the release of Neverlove, a music video for the album track "Super Pretty Naughty" was to be premiered by Entertainment Tonight, but according to Buck 65 on his website, "...when they saw the video and heard the song, they banned it from their show for what they deemed to be objectionable visual and lyrical content."

Hiatus
Buck 65 played two shows with Symphony Nova Scotia on October 2 and 3, 2015 in Halifax, Nova Scotia, in one of his final appearances before an extended hiatus. He was unable to perform a scheduled DJ set at the CBC Music Festival in Toronto on May 28, 2016, due to last-minute technical difficulties.

Aside from a performance on July 10, 2018, at a tribute concert for the late Anticon Records co-founder Brendon Whitney aka Alias, Buck 65 was on indefinite musical hiatus from October 2015 until early 2020.

He released a new album, King of Drums in 2022. It was included in the top ten of critic Robert Christgau's Dean's List for 2022.

Billy
In May 2020, Controller 7 released a new album, featuring Buck 65 on vocals and DJ scratches.

CBC Drive 
Terfry currently hosts the Drive program on CBC Music Radio, Monday through Friday from 3:30pm to 7pm EST. In the summer period of 2021, he also hosts Deep Dive on CBC Radio One as a replacement for the now-cancelled Vinyl Tap, where classic pop music albums are played in their entirety with their historical context discussed.

Selected discography

Buck 65
 Year Zero (1996)
 Weirdo Magnet (1996)
 Language Arts (1996)
 Vertex (1997)
 Man Overboard (2001)
 Synesthesia (2001)
 Square (2002)
 Talkin' Honky Blues (2003)
 Secret House Against the World (2005)
 Strong Arm (2006)
 Situation (2007)
 Dirtbike 1-3 (2008)
 20 Odd Years (2011)
 Laundromat Boogie (2014)
 Neverlove (2014)
 Dirtbike 4 (2015)
 King Of Drums (2022)

Stinkin' Rich (Pre-Buck 65 name)
 Chin Music (1993)
 Game Tight (1995)
 Weirdo Magnet (Original version) (1996)

Bike for Three! (Buck 65 with Greetings from Tuskan)
 More Heart Than Brains (2009)
 So Much Forever (2014)

Sebutones (Buck 65 with Sixtoo)
 Psoriasis (1996)
 50/50 Where It Counts (1997)

with Greymatter
 Johnny Rockwell Meets Henry Krinkle (1998)

with Controller 7
 Tommy and Richie present "Billy" (2020)

with Tachichi
 Flash Grenade (2022)

Awards and nominations
 2003: Square – Nomination for the Juno Award for Alternative Album of the Year
 2004: Talkin' Honky Blues – Winner of the Juno Award for Alternative Album of the Year
 2005: Nomination for the Juno Award for Songwriter of the Year
 2006: "Devil's Eyes" – Winner of the Juno Award for Video of the Year
 2011: "What's Wrong With That?" from the film Year of the Carnivore – Nomination for the Genie Award for Achievement in Music – Original Song

References

External links

 
 
 

1972 births
Canadian male rappers
Canadian hip hop record producers
Canadian DJs
Canadian people of Scottish descent
Hip hop activists
Living people
Musicians from Nova Scotia
People from Hants County, Nova Scotia
Murderecords artists
Anticon artists
Juno Award for Alternative Album of the Year winners
20th-century Canadian rappers
21st-century Canadian rappers
20th-century Canadian male musicians
21st-century Canadian male musicians